Dean Ryan Solomons (born 22 February 1999) is a South African professional soccer player who plays as a defender.

Club career
A product of Ikamva, the youth academy of Ajax Cape Town, Solomons transferred to the parent club in Amsterdam in 2017. He made his debut for the main squad of Ajax on 7 July 2018 in a friendly against FC Nordsjælland, as a 83rd-minute substitute for Luis Manuel Orejuela.

He made his Eerste Divisie debut for Jong Ajax on 10 September 2018 in a game against Jong AZ, as a starter.

On 30 March 2021, it was announced that Solomons had signed with Swedish Allsvenskan side Varbergs BoIS on a 3-year contract. In December 2021, he was released by the Swedish side.

References

External links
 

1999 births
Living people
Soccer players from Cape Town
South African soccer players
Association football defenders
AFC Ajax players
Jong Ajax players
Varbergs BoIS players
Eerste Divisie players
Allsvenskan players
South African expatriate soccer players
Expatriate footballers in the Netherlands
Expatriate footballers in Sweden